Peinado is a stratovolcano in Argentina, which has  likely erupted within the past 12,000 years. It has young, well preserved lava flows from the summit and flank vents, which extend up to 10 km from the summit. Radiometric dating has yielded an age of 42,000 ± 7,000 years before present.

See also
 Cerro Torta
 List of volcanoes in Argentina

References

External links
Peinado at Oregon State University

Stratovolcanoes of Argentina
Subduction volcanoes
Mountains of Argentina
Polygenetic volcanoes
Pleistocene stratovolcanoes